The Nain Rouge (French for "red dwarf") also called "Demon of the Strait", is a legendary creature of the Detroit, Michigan area whose appearance is said to presage misfortune. Its origins in the early French settlement of Detroit are proposed as deriving from  Norman French tales of the lutin, a type of hobgoblin, along with Native American legends of an "impish offspring of the Stone God".

According to various narratives surrounding the figure, Detroit's founder Antoine de la Mothe Cadillac was told by a fortuneteller to appease the Nain Rouge, but upon encountering the creature, he smacked it with his cane and shouted, "Get out of my way, you red imp!" As a consequence, a string of bad luck befell Cadillac; he was charged with abuse of power and reassigned to Louisiana, later returning to France where he was briefly imprisoned and eventually lost his fortune.

The Nain Rouge legend has become part of contemporary Detroit culture. Each Spring, the city hosts a community festival and costume parade called the Marche du Nain Rouge.

Legend
Marie Caroline Watson Hamlin's 1883 Legends of Le Détroit described the Nain Rouge as a dwarf, "very red in the face, with a bright, glistening eye; instead of burning, it froze, instead of possessing depth emitted a cold gleam like the reflection from a polished surface, bewildering and dazzling all who came within its focus," and with "a grinning mouth displaying sharp, pointed teeth, completed this strange face". Other accounts describe the Nain Rouge as a small creature with red or black fur covering an animal's body but with the face of an old man with "blazing red eyes and rotten teeth."

According to some scholars, the legend of Nain Rouge has its origins in local Native American beliefs of spirit creatures that inhabited the region, which were subsequently retold by European colonists. According to Wellesley College assistant professor Kate Grandjean, "My personal feeling is it's really not quite as simple as just European colonists appropriating some Native American spirit". Grandjean said, "I think, and it seems to be demonstrable in the historical record, that the Nain that we know in Detroit today probably has both French and Native traditions sort of wrapped up in it."

There are no records that indicate the legend of the Nain Rouge existed in the 18th century, when Antoine de la Mothe Cadillac was in authority in Detroit. The earliest record, Hamlin's Legends of Le Détroit, wasn't published until 1883, 180 years after Cadillac was said to have been cursed by the Nain Rouge.

Legend holds that Nain Rouge's appearance would presage terrible events for the city. The creature is said to have appeared on July 30, 1763 before the Battle of Bloody Run, where 58 British soldiers were killed by Native Americans from Chief Pontiac's Ottawa tribe. Supposedly, the Nain Rouge "danced among the corpses" on the banks of the Detroit River after the battle, and the river "turned red with blood" for days after. According to the tale, all the misfortunes of Governor and General William Hull leading to the surrender of Detroit in the War of 1812 are blamed on the Nain Rouge.

Local culture 

The Nain Rouge legend has become an enduring part of the folklore of the Detroit area. Two utility workers claim to have seen the creature just before the 1967 Detroit riots, and supposedly, it was also seen before an ice storm in 1976.  Detroit Beer Company, a brewpub in Downtown Detroit, has as its signature brew a "Detroit Dwarf" lager, named in honor of the Nain Rouge. In 2015 Woodberry Wine, a distributor and wholesaler of fine wines and Kindred Vines Import Company, an importer of French and Italian wines both based out of the Metro-Detroit area introduced "Nain Rouge Red"; a French red wine blend named after the Nain Rouge dwarf.

Marche du Nain Rouge 

Each Spring, Detroit holds a costumed community parade called the Marche du Nain Rouge  in which the creature is traditionally chased out of the city, although the revival parade stays entirely within the Midtown/Cass Corridor neighborhood. At the conclusion of the parade, an effigy of the Nain Rouge is destroyed, thus "banishing the evil spirit from the city for another year". According to tradition, parade participants and spectators are encouraged to wear different costumes each year, so that when the Nain Rouge next returns, he will not recognize the persons who ousted him from the city limits and thus will not be able to seek personal vengeance.

The 2011 event featured a parade followed by the banishment and a party in Cass Park, drawing hundreds of guests. At the parade, organizations calling themselves "The Friends of the Nain Rouge" and "We Are Nain Rouge" have lightheartedly "protested" the banishment parade, arguing that the Nain Rouge is not to blame for the city's ills, and that considering Detroit's population loss, no one should be banished from the city, particularly those who have been there the longest. Both groups also work toward making the event a celebration of Detroit's folkloric ancient guardian. The banishment parade has also taken place in 2012, 2013, 2014, 2015, 2016, 2017, and 2018. Recent parades have drawn an estimated 5,000 revelers each year. The 2014 parade included a short speech from Alexis Wiley, Mayor Mike Duggan's representative.

See also
Mothman
Pukwudgie
Spring-heeled Jack

References

Further reading
Myths and Legends of our Lands, vol. 6, by Charles M. Skinner, printed about 1896, Nain Rouge.

External links 
Marche du Nain Rouge official site

American legendary creatures
Culture of Detroit
European-American culture in Detroit
French-American culture in Michigan
History of Detroit
Michigan folklore
Supernatural legends